Anthony George Popplewell  (born 1 May 1941) is a New Zealand rower.

Popplewell was born in 1941 in Rotherham, New Zealand. He represented New Zealand at the 1964 Summer Olympics. He is listed as New Zealand Olympian athlete number 196 by the New Zealand Olympic Committee. In the 2007 New Year Honours, he was appointed an Officer of the New Zealand Order of Merit, for services to rowing and sports administration.

Popplewell was operations director for the 2010 World Rowing Championships held at Lake Karapiro near Cambridge, New Zealand. Along with Ivan Sutherland, Nathan Twaddle, and John Wylie, Popplewell is on the executive of the New Zealand Rowing Foundation, an organisation aiming to fund junior and under-23 rowers who don't qualify for high performance funding.

References

1941 births
Living people
New Zealand male rowers
Rowers at the 1964 Summer Olympics
Olympic rowers of New Zealand
People from Rotherham, New Zealand
Officers of the New Zealand Order of Merit
Sportspeople from Canterbury, New Zealand